Koksay (Kóksaı) is a copper deposit located in south eastern Kazakhstan in Almaty region around 230 km from Almaty. The deposit is KAZ Minerals Group’s third major growth project and was acquired in June 2014 for $260 million.

General

The project is at scoping stage. It has an estimated production life of over 20 years with a measured and indicated mineral resource of 701 MT with copper grade of 0.44%. The estimated annual production is 85 kt of copper in concentrate along with gold, silver and molybdenum by-products.

See also
 KAZ Minerals
 Bozshakol
 Aktogay
 Bozymchak

References

External links 
 
 Koksay Project page

Copper mines in Kazakhstan
Kazakhmys